The women's shot put event  at the 1991 IAAF World Indoor Championships was held on 10 March.

Results

References

Shot
Shot put at the World Athletics Indoor Championships
1991 in women's athletics